Juan Prats (ca. 1800 – ca. 1870) was Mayor of Ponce, Puerto Rico, twice in 1849. He was a landowner, owning—among others—Hacienda La Matilde, in Ponce. He was also an appraiser, best known for the contentious appraisal of the plot of land where the Ponce City Hall was built.

Background 
Prats was a Spaniard from Catalonia. In 1841 —eight years before he became mayor— as a result of a legal dispute brought against the municipality of Ponce by Catalina Rodriguez, granddaughter of José Rodriguez (a.k.a., "El Portugués", and after whom sources state Río Portugués is said to have been named), Prats was contracted by the Municipality to appraise a land property that Catalina Rodriguez owned and which the Municipality wanted to build on. He was a very wealthy merchant and hacendado. At the height of his wealth, he was the wealthiest man in Ponce and one of the wealthiest in Puerto Rico. In 1859 he owned three sugar haciendas in addition to his wholesale company.

First mayoral term
Juan Prats was mayor of Ponce beginning on 1 January 1849 and ending on 30 June 1849, when Esteban Vidal started serving as mayor.

Second mayoral term
Prats again served as mayor beginning on 1 October 1849 and ending on 31 December 1849, when Flavius Dede began his mayoral term.

References

See also

List of Puerto Ricans
List of mayors of Ponce, Puerto Rico

Mayors of Ponce, Puerto Rico
1800s births
1870s deaths
Year of birth uncertain
Year of death uncertain